The Laois Junior Hurling Championship is an annual hurling competition contested by lower-tier Laois GAA clubs.

Ballypickas are the title holders (2021) defeating near neighbours Abbeyleix in the Final.

Ballypickas are both the current holders and joint most winners at this grade along with Camross (8).

Honours
The trophy presented to the winners is the Fr Phelan Cup.

The winners of the Laois Junior Championship qualify to represent their county in the Leinster Junior Club Hurling Championship. They often do well there, with the likes of Ballyfin (2011) getting to a Leinster Final after winning the Laois Junior Hurling Championship but Kilkenny GAA club St Patrick's beat them on their way to the All-Ireland title. The winners can, in turn, go on to play in the All-Ireland Junior Club Hurling Championship.

List of finals
(r) = replay

Laois Junior B Hurling Championship

The Laois Junior B Hurling Championship is an annual hurling competition contested by fourth grade Laois GAA clubs. ? are the title holders (2022) defeating ? in the Final.

The trophy presented to the winners is the Eamon MacCluskey Cup.

List of finals
(r) = replay

Laois Junior C Hurling Championship

The Laois Junior C Hurling Championship is an annual hurling competition contested by fifth grade Laois GAA clubs. The Harps are the title holders (2022) defeating Park–Ratheniska–Timahoe in the Final.

List of finals

References

External links
Official Laois GAA Website
Laois on Hoganstand
Roll of Honour

3
Junior hurling county championships